Petuaghat Fishing Harbour is a fishing harbour established near the mouth of the Rasulpur River at Petuaaghat in Purba Medinipur district.  The port originated in 2010 in the then West Bengal's then-fashioned M. K. Narayanan. The port has been developed in 11.8 hectares of land. The port is India's seventh largest fishing port.  The port has 400 deep sea fishing trawlers and 200 traditional trawlers. There is also one ice mill, an ice house, a fake fabric center, and a trailer oil sales center at the port. A trailer repair center has also been proposed to be built.

Construction

Construction of the harbour began during the Left Front regime in 2005. The project was announced on 1 March 2005 by the fisheries minister Kiranmoy Nanda with a budget of 32 cores, half of which was to be given by the centre and rest by the state. This was the sixth fishing port in the state established, the others being two in Shankarpur, and one each in Kakdwip, Frazergunj and Diamond Harbour. The construction was completed in 2010.  The cost of construction of the port is estimated to be 200 crore. In the first phase, the port costing 60 crore was spent. The second step has started. This step will build a dry dock at the port.

See also
 Kakdwip Fishing Port

References

External links 
Petuaghat in Wikimapia

Ports and harbours of West Bengal